Jim Sheridan (born 6 February 1949) is an Irish playwright and filmmaker.  
Between 1989 and 1993, Sheridan directed two critically acclaimed films set in Ireland, My Left Foot and In the Name of the Father, and later directed the films The Boxer and In America. Sheridan received six Academy Award nominations.

Life and career
Jim Sheridan was born in Dublin, Ireland on 6 February 1949. He is the brother of playwright Peter Sheridan. The family ran a lodging house, while Anna Sheridan worked at a hotel and Peter Sheridan Snr was a railway clerk with CIÉ. Sheridan's early education was at a Christian Brothers school. In 1969 he attended University College Dublin to study English and History. In 1972, he graduated with a Bachelor of Arts degree in English. He became involved in student theater there, where he met Neil Jordan, who also was later to become an important Irish film director.  After graduating from UCD in 1972, Sheridan and his brother began writing and staging plays, and in the late 1970s began working with the Project Theatre Company.

In 1981, Sheridan emigrated to Canada, but eventually settled in the Hell's Kitchen section of New York City.  He enrolled in NYU's Tisch School of the Arts and became the artistic director of the Irish Arts Center.

Sheridan returned to Ireland in the late 1980s.  In 1989, he directed My Left Foot, which became a critical and commercial success and won Daniel Day-Lewis and Brenda Fricker Academy Awards. He followed that with The Field (with Richard Harris) in 1990; then with In the Name of the Father in 1993, a fictionalized re-telling of the case of the Guildford Four. The film won the Golden Bear at the 44th Berlin International Film Festival.

In 1996 he co-wrote Some Mother's Son with Terry George. The Boxer (with Daniel Day-Lewis) was nominated for a Golden Globe for best film drama in 1997. The film was Sheridan's third collaboration with Day-Lewis after My Left Foot and In the Name of the Father, making him the only director to work with Day-Lewis on three films. In 2003, he released the semi-autobiographical In America, which tells the story of a family of Irish immigrants trying to succeed in New York. The film received positive reviews and earned Samantha Morton and Djimon Hounsou Academy Award nominations. In 2005 he released Get Rich or Die Tryin', a film starring rap star 50 Cent.

Sheridan helmed the 2009 film Brothers, starring Tobey Maguire and Jake Gyllenhaal, which was shot in New Mexico. He also directed the thriller Dream House, which starred Daniel Craig, Naomi Watts, and Rachel Weisz.

He is the son of Anne and Pete Sheridan. He has 3 daughters, Kirsten Sheridan, Naomi Sheridan, Tess Sheridan with Fran Sheridan. He had another daughter Amira Clodagh Sheridan with the film director Zahara Moufid. He has 6 siblings: Ita Rafferty, Peter Sheridan, John Sheridan, Frankie Sheridan, Gerard Sheridan and Paul Sheridan.

In 2015, Sheridan was awarded UCD Alumnus of the Year in Arts & Humanities.

Filmography

Films 
{| class="wikitable sortable"
|+
!Title
!Year
!Director
!Producer
!Writer
!Notes
|-
|My Left Foot
|1989
|
|
|
|Directorial debut
|-
|The Field
|1990
|
|
|
|
|-
|Into the West
|1992
|
|
|
|
|-
|In the Name of the Father
|1993
|
|
|
|
|-
|Some Mother's Son
|1996
|
|
|
|
|-
|The Boxer
|1997
|
|
|
|
|-
|Agnes Browne
|1999
|
|
|
|
|-
|In America
|2002
|
|
|
|
|-
|Get Rich or Die Tryin'
|2005
|
|
|
|
|-
|''A Portrait of an Artist:The Making of 'Get Rich or Die Tryin|2006
|
|
|
| Documentary short
|-
|Brothers
|2009
|
|
|
|
|-
|Dream House
|2011
|
|
|
|
|-
|The Secret Scripture
|2016
|
|
|
|
|-
|11th Hour
|2017
|
|
|
|Short film
|-
|}Executive producer Borstal Boy (2000)
 On the Edge (2001)
 Bloody Sunday (2002)
 Where's Daddy! (2006) (Short film)
 Dollhouse (2012)
 Omar Sharif's Tribute (2015) (Documentary)
 The Making of the Secret Scripture (2017) (Documentary)
 Inside Apollo House (2017) (TV documentary film)
 The Making of 11th Hour (2017) (Documentary short)
 Shelter me: Apollo House (2018) (Documentary)
 First Disco (2019) (Short film)
 Hitmanforhire.net (TBA) Acting credits Television series 

 Music video 
 "You Made Me the Thief of Your Heart" by Sinéad O'Connor (1994)

Awards and nominationsAcademy Awards Best Original Screenplay – In America (2004), nomination (as co-writer)
 Best Adapted Screenplay – In the Name of the Father (1994), nomination (as co-writer)
 Best Director – In the Name of the Father (1994), nomination (as director)
 Best Picture – In the Name of the Father (1994), nomination (as producer)
 Best Adapted Screenplay – My Left Foot (1990), nomination (as co-writer)
 Best Director – My Left Foot (1990), nomination (as director)Berlin Film Festival 1994, Golden Bear – In the Name of the Father, winner
 1998, Golden Bear – The Boxer, nominationBritish Academy Film Awards Best Adapted Screenplay – In the Name of the Father (1993), nomination (as co-writer)Golden Globe AwardsBest Screenplay – In America (2002), nomination (as co-writer)
Best Director – The Boxer (1997), nominationIndependent Spirit Awards Best Director – In America (2002), nomination
 Best Director - The Secret Scripture (2016), nomination
 Best Director - Brothers (2009), winner
 Lifetime Achievement Award - (2015), WinnerNational Board of Review Best Original Screenplay – In America (2002), winner (as co-writer)Writers Guild of America Best Original Screenplay – In America (2002), nomination (as co-writer)Gregory Peck Award'''

 Lifetime Achievement  - Dingle International Film Festival (2009)

References

External links
 Jim Sheridan's official website
 Jim Sheridan's official website - Hell's Kitchen Limited

Jim Sheridan Bibliography (via UC Berkeley)

1949 births
Living people
20th-century Irish people
21st-century Irish people
Alumni of University College Dublin
Irish film directors
Irish film producers
Irish male dramatists and playwrights
Irish male screenwriters
Irish racehorse owners and breeders
Film people from Dublin (city)
Tisch School of the Arts alumni
Directors of Golden Bear winners